This page lists members of Lycée Louis-le-Grand, under the institution's successive identities including as Collège de Clermont from 1563 to 1682. It includes alumni, faculty, and administrators. Where available, it indicates the period when the individual was active at Louis-le-Grand. In each section, individuals are listed by chronological order of birthdate, which largely correlates with chronological order of presence at Louis-le-Grand. 

The list does not include individuals who studied or taught in other educational institutions that later merged into Louis-le-Grand or into whose former premises Louis-le-Grand expanded. Such cases include names that are occasionally but questionably referred to as Louis-le-Grand alumni, e.g.

Alumni

Writers, philosophers and social scientists
Writers and poets
 Charles de Saint-Évremond (1613-1703) in the 1620s
 Bussy-Rabutin (1618-1693) in the early 1630s
 Jean de Santeul (1630-1697) in the 1640s
 Pierre-Robert de Cideville (1693-1776) around 1710
 Jean-Jacques Lefranc de Pompignan (1709-1784) in the 1720s
 Marquis de Sade (1740-1814) in 1750-1754
 Victor Hugo (1802-1885) in 1816-1818
 Théophile Gautier (1811-1872) in 1820
 Charles Baudelaire (1821-1867) in 1836-1839
 Octave Feuillet (1821-1890) in the 1830s
 Paul Bourget (1852-1935) ca. late 1860s
 Romain Rolland (1866-1944) in the mid-1880s; Nobel Prize for Literature in 1915 
 Léon Daudet (1867-1942) in the early 1880s
 Paul Claudel (1868-1955) in 1882-1885
 Paul Fort (1872-1960) in the 1880s
 Charles Péguy (1873-1914) part-time in 1891-1894
 Valery Larbaud (1881-1957) in the 1890s
 Alain-Fournier (1886-1914) in 1906-1907
 Jean Guéhenno (1890-1978) in 1910-1911
 Joseph Kessel (1898-1979) in the 1910s
 Jacques Rigaut (1898-1929) in the mid-1910s
 Pierre-Henri Simon (1903-1972) ca. 1921-1923
 Léopold Sédar Senghor (1906-2001) in the late 1920s
 Maurice Bardèche (1907-1998) in 1922-1928
 Phạm Duy Khiêm (1908-1974) ca. 1929-1931
 Robert Merle (1908-2004) ca. late 1920ssist
 René Étiemble (1909-2002) ca. 1927-1929
 Robert Brasillach (1909-1945) in 1925-1928
 Henri Queffélec (1910-1992) in the late 1920s
 Paul Guth (1910-1997) ca. late 1920s
 Aimé Césaire (1913-2008) in 1931-1935
 Roland Barthes (1915-1980) ca. 1931-1934
 Maurice Druon (1918-2009) in the late 1930s
 Michel Butor (1926-2016) in the 1940s
 Claude Esteban (1935-2006) ca. mid-1950s
 Jean-Loup Dabadie (1938-2020) in the 1950s
 Régis Debray (1940) in the late 1950s
 Olivier Rolin (1947) ca. mid-1960s
 Bernard-Henri Lévy (1948) in 1966-1968
 Frédéric Beigbeder (1965) in the early 1980s
Philosophers
 Voltaire (1694-1778) in 1704-1711
 Denis Diderot (1713-1784) around 1729-1732
 Julien Benda (1867-1956) in the early 1880s
 Jean Wahl (1888-1974) ca. 1906-1907
 Jean Guitton (1901-1999) in 1919-1920
 Jean Cavaillès (1903-1944) in 1920-1923
 Jean-Paul Sartre (1905-1980) in 1922-1924; Nobel Prize for Literature in 1964
 Maurice de Gandillac (1906-2006) ca. 1922-1924
 Maurice Merleau-Ponty (1908-1961) in the 1920s
 Jean-François Lyotard (1924-1998) ca. early 1940s
 Bertrand Poirot-Delpech (1929-2006) in the 1940s
 Jacques Derrida (1930-2004) in 1949-1952
 Alain Badiou (1937) in the mid-1950s
 Alain de Benoist (1943) ca. early 1960s
 Georges Chapouthier (1945) ca. early 1960s
 Philippe-Joseph Salazar (1955) 1973-1975
 Souleymane Bachir Diagne (1955) in the mid-1970s
Linguists, historians, anthropologists, sociologists, economists
 Émile Littré (1801-1881) in the 1810s
 Eugène Burnouf (1801-1852) in the 1810s
 Jean-Barthélemy Hauréau (1812-1896) in the 1820s
 Frédéric Passy (1822-1912) ca. 1833-1835; Nobel Peace Prize in 1901
 Charles Barbier de Meynard (1826-1908) ca. mid-1840s
 Gaston Maspero (1846-1916) in the early 1860s
 Auguste Angellier (1848-1911) ca. 1865-1866
 Ferdinand Brunetière (1849-1906) in the late 1860s
 Émile Durkheim (1858-1917) in the late 1870s
 Georges Goyau (1869-1939) in the late 1870s
 André Lichtenberger (1870-1940) in the 1880s
 Joseph Vendryes (1875-1960) around 1890
 Marc Bloch (1886-1944) ca. 1900-1904
 Émile-Guillaume Léonard (1891-1961) ca. 1908-1911
 Georges Dumézil (1898-1986) ca. 1914-1916
 Henri Laoust (1905-1983) in the early 1920s
 Maurice Allais (1911-2010) in 1930-1931; Nobel Memorial Prize in Economic Sciences in 1988
 Jacqueline de Romilly (1913-2010) ca. 1931-1933
 Jean-Henri Azéma (1913-2000) in the mid-1930s
 Jean-Pierre Vernant (1914-2007) in the early 1930s
 Jacques Le Goff (1924-2014) in the early 1940s
 Lucien Bianco (1930) ca. 1951-1952
 Pierre Bourdieu (1930-2002) in 1948-1951
 Claude Hagège (1936) in 1953-1955
 Alexandre Adler (1950) in the late 1960s
 Thomas Piketty (1971) ca. 1987-1989

Artists
Playwrights, actors and filmmakers
 Molière (1622-1673) possibly in the early 1640s 
 Georges Méliès (1861-1938) in the late 1870s
 René Clair (1898-1981) in the mid-1910s
 Michel Cournot (1922-2007) in the late 1930s
 Jean-Paul Belmondo (1933-2021) in the early 1950s
 Patrice Chéreau (1944-2013) in the early 1960s
 André Weinfeld (1947) ca. mid-1960s
 Jérôme Deschamps (1947) in the 1960s
Visual artists
 Théodore Géricault (1791-1824) in 1806-1810
 Eugène Delacroix (1798-1863) in 1806-1815
 Edgar Degas (1834-1917) in 1845-1853
 Frédéric Auguste Bartholdi (1834-1904) in 1843-1851
 Gustave Caillebotte (1848-1894) in the late 1850s (in Vanves)
 François Flameng (1856-1923) ca. early 1870s
 Lucien Simon (1861-1945) in the 1870s
 Pierre Bonnard (1867-1947) in the 1880s
 François Tuefferd (1912-1996) around 1920
Composers
 Fabien Lévy (1968) in the 1980s

Scientists
 René Castel (1758-1832) in the 1770s
 Jean-Baptiste Biot (1774-1862) ca. 1780-1791
 Michel Chasles (1793-1880) in 1809-1812
 Gabriel Lamé (1795-1870) ca. 1810-1814
 Arthur Morin (1795-1880) ca. 1810-1813
 Irénée-Jules Bienaymé (1796-1878) ca. 1812-1815
 Évariste Galois (1811-1832) in 1823-1829
 Paul-Quentin Desains (1817-1885) ca. 1830-1835
 Charles Hermite (1822-1901) in 1840-1842
 Étienne-Émile Desvaux (1830-1854) ca. 1843-1847
 Alphonse Laveran (1845-1922) ca. 1860-1863; Nobel Prize in Medicine in 1907
 Eugène Goblet d'Alviella (1846-1925) ca. 1862-1865
 Henri Becquerel (1852-1908) ca. 1868-1872; Nobel Prize in Physics in 1870
 Alfred Binet (1857-1911) ca. mid-1870s
 Jacques Hadamard (1865-1963) in the late 1870s and early 1880s
 Félix d'Hérelle (1873-1949) around 1890
 Jean Becquerel (1878-1953) in the 1890s
 Louis Leprince-Ringuet (1901-2000) in the 1910s
 Étienne Wolff (1904-1996) in the early 1920s
 Jean Bernard (1907-2006) in the early 1920s
 Laurent Schwartz (1915-2002) in 1932-1934; Fields Medal 1950
 Yves Colin de Verdière (1933) ca. early 1960s
 Serge Haroche (1944) ca. 1960-1963; Nobel Prize for Physics in 2012
 Olivier Faugeras (1949) ca. 1969-1971
 Gilles Pisier (1950) in 1967-1969
 Pierre-Louis Lions (1956) in 1973-1975; Fields Medal 1994
 Jean-Christophe Yoccoz (1957-2016) ca. 1971-1975; Fields Medal 1994
 Laurent Lafforgue (1966) in the mid-1980s; Fields Medal 2002
 Cédric Villani (1973) in 1990-1992; Fields Medal 2010

Statesmen and politicians
French heads of state and/or government
 Cardinal de Fleury (1653-1743),  first minister 1726-1743, at LLG ca. 1659-1665
 René Nicolas de Maupeou (1714-1792), chief minister 1770-1774, around 1730
 Maximilien de Robespierre (1758-1794), leader of the revolutionary government 1793-1794, in 1769-1781
 Paul Deschanel (1855-1922), President of the Republic in 1920, ca. 1865-1871
 Alexandre Millerand (1859-1943), President of the Republic 1920-1924, ca. 1875
 Raymond Poincaré (1860-1934), President of the Republic 1913-1920, ca. late 1870s
 Paul Painlevé (1863-1933), Prime Minister in 1917 and 1925, in 1877-1883
 Pierre Mendès France (1907-1982), President of the Council 1954-1955, ca. 1923
 Maurice Couve de Murville (1907-1999), Prime Minister 1968-1969, ca. early 1920s
 Alain Poher (1909-1996), acting President of the Republic in 1969 and 1974, ca. late 1920s
 Georges Pompidou (1911-1974), President of the Republic 1969-1974, ca. 1929-1931
 Michel Debré (1912-1996), Prime Minister 1959-1962, around 1930
 Pierre Messmer (1916-2007), Prime Minister 1972-1974, ca. early 1930s
 Valéry Giscard d'Estaing (1926-2020), President of the Republic 1974-1981, ca. 1940-1946
 Michel Rocard (1930-2016), Prime Minister 1988-1991, ca. mid-1940s
 Jacques Chirac (1932-2019), President of the Republic 1995-2002, ca. 1949-1951
 Alain Juppé (1945), Prime Minister 1995-1997, in 1962-1964
 Laurent Fabius (1946), Prime Minister 1984-1986, ca. 1964-1966
Heads of state and/or government in other countries
 Nicholas I of Montenegro (1841-1921), first and last King of Montenegro 1910-1918, at LLG ca. late 1850s
 Milan I of Serbia (1854-1901), King of Serbia 1882-1889, ca. 1861-1868
 Léopold Sédar Senghor (1906-2001), first President of Senegal 1960-1980, ca. 1929-1931
 Paul Biya (1933), President of Cameroon since 1982, in the 1950s
Other prominent politicians and public servants
 Armand de Bourbon, Prince of Conti (1629-1666), in the 1640s
 Étienne François, duc de Choiseul (1719-1785), secretary of state, at LLG ca. 1729-1730
 Cardinal de Bernis (1715-1794), diplomat and author, around 1730
 Charles Carroll of Carrollton (1737-1832), signatory of the United States Declaration of Independence, in the early 1750s
 Louis-Marie Stanislas Fréron (1754-1802), revolutionary leader, in the 1770s
 Camille Desmoulins (1760-1794), revolutionary leader, in the 1770s
 Victor Schœlcher (1804-1893), leading French abolitionist, in 1818-1819
 Édouard Drouyn de Lhuys (1805-1881), foreign affairs minister, in the 1820s
 Eugène Belgrand (1810-1878), public works leader, ca. 1828-1829
 Émile Beaussire (1824-1889), deputy and philosopher, ca. early 1840s
 Henry Adrian Churchill (1828-1886), British explorer and diplomat, in 1841-1846
 Paul d'Estournelles de Constant (1852-1924), diplomat, in 1862-1870; Nobel Peace Prize in 1909
 Jean Jaurès (1859-1914), founding president of the French Socialist Party, in the mid-1870s
 Maurice Papon (1910-2007), French minister, in the 1920s
 Edgard Pisani (1918-2016), French minister and European Commissioner, in 1939
 Jacques de Larosière (1929), central banker, in the late 1940s
 Jean Tiberi (1935), Mayor of Paris 1995-2001, in the early 1950s
 Aziz Mekouar (1950), Moroccan diplomat, around 1970
 Jean-Marie Le Guen (1953), junior minister, in the early 1970s
 Thierry Breton (1955), French minister and European Commissioner, in 1972-1975
 Ridha Grira (1955), Tunisian minister, ca. 1974-1976
 Božidar Đelić (1965), Serbian Finance Minister 2001–2003, in 1980-1984

Business leaders
 Louis Hachette (1800-1864), founder of Hachette (publisher), ca. 1815-1819
 Eugène Goüin (1818-1909), cofounder and later chairman of the Banque de Paris et des Pays-Bas, in the 1830s
 André Michelin (1853-1931), co-founder of Michelin, in the early 1870s
 André Citroën (1878-1935), founder of Citroën, ca. 1896-1898
 Michel Pébereau (1942), builder of BNP Paribas, around 1960
 Jean-Charles Naouri (1949), owner of Groupe Casino, ca. 1965-1967
 Jean-Sébastien Jacques (1971), CEO of Rio Tinto, ca. 1990-1994

Religious figures
 Saint Francis de Sales (1567-1622) in 1578-1588
 Pierre de Bérulle (1575-1629) ca. 1591-1595
 Jean François Paul de Gondi, Cardinal de Retz (1613-1679) in 1625-1631
 Claude Poullart des Places (1679-1709) in the early 1700s
 John Dubois (1764-1842) ca. 1773-1785
 Dalil Boubakeur (1940) ca. 1957-1959
 Philippe Jourdan (1960) ca. late 1970s

Military leaders and resistance fighters
 Charles François Dumouriez (1739-1823) in the 1750s
 Louis Vallin (1770-1854) ca. late 1780s / early 1790s
 Maxime Weygand (1867-1965) in the early 1880s
 Henri Honoré d'Estienne d'Orves (1901-1941) in 1919-1921
 Pierre Brossolette (1903-1944) ca. 1921-1922
 Jacques Lusseyran (1924-1971) in 1940-1943
 Thomas Elek (1924-1944) ca. 1940-1941

Other notable alumni
 Ernest Malinowski (1818-1899), Polish civil engineer, in 1832-1834
 Arthur Chassériau (1850-1934), art collector, ca. late 1860s / early 1870s
 Jacques Vergès (1926), lawyer, ca. 1936-1940
 Jacques Frémontier (1930-2020), journalist and television producer, ca. mid-1940s
 Gaston Juchet (1930-2007), engineer, ca. early 1950s
 Claude Ribbe (1954), activist and filmmaker, ca. early 1960s
 Philippe Boisse (1955), fencer, ca. early 1970s

Faculty

 Juan Maldonado (1533-1583)
 Juan de Mariana (1536-1624)
 Francisco Suárez (1548-1617)
 Philippe Labbe (1607-1667)
 René Rapin (1621-1687)
 Ignace-Gaston Pardies (1636-1673)
 Marc-Antoine Charpentier (1643-1704)
 Charles de La Rue (1643-1725)
 René-Joseph de Tournemine (1661-1739)
 Claude Buffier (1661-1737)
 Jean-Baptiste Du Halde (1674-1743)
 Charles Porée (1675-1741)
 Pierre Brumoy (1688-1742)
 Charles Pierre Chapsal (1787-1858)
 Anatole Bailly (1833-1911)
 Henri Théophile Bocquillon (1834-1884)
 Jean Gaston Darboux (1842-1917)
 Auguste Burdeau (1851-1894)
 Jules Combarieu (1859-1916)
 Gustave Belot (1859-1929)
 Lucien Poincaré (1862-1920)
 Joseph Bédier (1864-1938)
 André Bellessort (1866-1942)
 Henri Abraham (1868-1943)
 Félicien Challaye (1875-1967)
 Étienne Weill-Raynal (1887-1982)
 Jean Guéhenno (1890-1978)
 Georges Bidault (1899-1983)
 Ferdinand Alquié (1906-1985)
 Charles Pellat (1914-1992)
 Robert Misrahi (1926)
 Philippe Contamine (1932)
 André Warusfel (1936-2016)
 Donald Adamson (1939)
 Roger Chartier (1945)
 Gilles Deleuze (1925-1995)

Administrators

Jesuit rectors
This list is mainly based on the monography published in 1845 by Gustave Émond.
 Ponce Cogordan (c.1563-1564)
 Edmund Hay (c.1564-1575)
 Pierre-Claude Mathieu (c.1575-1579)
 Odon Pigenat (c.1580-1581)
 Jean Sangenot (c.1582-1583)
 Alexandre Georges (c.1584-1593)
 Pierre Barny (1606)
 François Thyal (1607)
 Jean-Baptiste de Machault (c.1608-1613)
 Charles de la Tour (c.1613-1617)
 Jacques Sirmond (c.1617-1621)
 Jean Filleau (c.1622-1625 and 1630)
 Ignace Armand (c.1626-1629)
 Étienne Binet (c.1631-1633)
 Louis Malrat (c.1634)
 Jacques Dinet (c.1635-1638)
  (c.1639-1646)
 Étienne Noël (c.1646-1649)
 Charles Lallemant (c.1649-1650 and 1660–1662)
 Jean-Baptiste Ragon (c.1651-1654)
 Philippe Shahu (c.1655-1657)
 Claude Boucher (c.1658-1659)
 Étienne Agard de Champs (c.1663-1667, 1682–1683, and 1687–1690)
 Jean de Turmenie (c.1668-1670)
 Pierre de Verthamon (c.1671-1673)
 Jean Pinette (c.1674-1677)
 Jacques Pallu (1678-1681)
 Jacques le Picart (c.1683-1686 and 1702–1704)
 Guillaume Ayrault (or Hurault) (c.1690-1693)
 Pierre Pommereau (c.1694-1697)
 Julien Baudran (c.1698-1699)
 Isaac Martineau (c.1700-1701)
  (ca. 1705)
 Henri-Charles Forcet (c.1706-1708)
 Charles Dauchez (c.1709-1711)
 Louis-François Clavyer (c.1712-1714)
 Louis Labbe (c.1715-1717)
 Honoré Gaillard (c.1718-1720)
 Jacques-Philippe Lallemant (c.1720)
 François de Richebourg (c.1721-1723)
 François de Canappeville (c.1724-1726)
 Jean-Baptiste Bellingan (c.1727-1730)
 Jacques de Guenonville (c.1731-1733) 
 Jean Lavant or Lavaux (c.1734-1737)
 Etienne Frogerais (c.1738-1740)
 Martin de Fontenelle (c.1741-1743)
 Joachim de la Grandville (c.1744-1748)
 Louis Le Gallic (c.1749-1751)
 Mathurin Germain Le Forestier (1752-1754)
 François de Saint-Jean (c.1754-1755)
 Mathieu-Jean-Joseph Allanic (c.1756-1759)
 Etienne de la Croix (c.1760)
 Henri Frelaut (c.1761-1762)

Principals
 Abbé Gardin du Mesnil (1764-1770)
 Abbé Poignard (1770-1778)
 Denis Bérardier (1778-1788)
 Jean-Louis Romet (1788-1791)
 Jean-François Champagne (1791-1808)

Provisors
 Jean-François Champagne (1808-1810)
 Louis-Joseph de Sermand (1810-1815)
 Louis Gabriel Taillefer (1815-1819).
 François Christophe Malleval (1819-1823)
 Nicolas Bertot or Berthot (1823-1824)
 Pierre-Laurent Laborie (1824-1830)
 Jules Amable Pierrot-Deseilligny (1830-1845)
  (1845-1853)
 Bernard Forneron (1853-1856)
 Jean-Baptiste Antoine Jullien (1856-1864)
 Frédéric Jules Edmond Didier (1864-1868)
  (1868-1878)
  (1878-1892)
  (1892-1895)
  (1895-1909)
 Georges Ferté (1909-1929)
 Émile Abry (1929-1931)
 Émile Berrod (1931-1938)
 Lucien Chattelun (1938-1941)
 Camille Gibelin (1941-1955)
 Mr Boyé (1942-1944, acting)
 Raymond Schiltz (1955-1968)
 Albert Praud (1968-1969)
 Paul Deheuvels (1969-1991)
 Yves de Saint-Do (1991-1997)
 Joël Vallat (1997-2012)
 Michel Bouchaud (2012-2015)
 Jean Bastianelli (2015-2020)
Joël Bianco (since 2020)

See also 

 Lycée Louis-le-Grand
 List of alumni of Jesuit educational institutions

References

Lycée Louis-le-Grand